Thomas Little (August 27, 1886 in Ogden, Utah – March 5, 1985 in Santa Monica, California) was a United States set decorator who worked on more than 450 Hollywood movies between 1932 and 1953. He won a total of 6 Oscars for art direction and received 21 nominations in the same category. His credits include The Keys of the Kingdom, The Fan, Belles on Their Toes, What Price Glory?, The Snows of Kilimanjaro, The Pride of St. Louis, and The Day the Earth Stood Still.

Academy Awards for Art Direction 
 1941 (Black-and-White) Richard Day, Nathan H. Juran, Thomas Little - How Green Was My Valley
 1942 (Black-and-White) Richard Day, Joseph C. Wright, Thomas Little - This Above All
 1942 (Color) Richard Day, Joseph C. Wright, Thomas Little - My Gal Sal 
 1943 (Black-and-White) James Basevi, William Darling, Thomas Little - The Song of Bernadette
 1944 (Color) Wiard Ihnen, Thomas Little - Wilson
 1946 (Black-and-White) William S. Darling, Lyle R. Wheeler, Thomas Little, Frank E. Hughes - Anna and the King of Siam

See also 
 Academy Award for Best Production Design

References

External links 
 

1886 births
1985 deaths
20th Century Studios people
Best Art Direction Academy Award winners
American set decorators
Artists from Ogden, Utah